Bengkalis (Kota Bengkalis) was the seat (capital) of Bengkalis Regency in the Riau province of Indonesia until 8 July 2013, when it became an independent city. It is located on Bengkalis Island. The city had a population of 66,211.

Bengkalis has a hot and humid equatorial/tropical climate. The city is humid throughout the year with daily temperature range 26 to 32 degrees Celsius.

Politics 
In recent election in 2020, Kasmarni and Bagus Santoso elected as regent and deputy regent from 2021.

Climate
Bengkalis has a tropical rainforest climate (Af) with heavy to very heavy rainfall year-round.

References

Regency seats of Riau
Populated places in Indonesia
Islands of Indonesia